Villa Rosa or Villarosa may refer to the following:

Municipality 
 Villa Rosa (Martinsicuro) 
 Villarosa

Architecture 
 Villa Rosa (Dresden)
 Villa Rosa (Fayetteville, Arkansas)
 
 , Bagheria, Italy
 , Malta

People with the surname Villarosa 
 Clara Villarosa (born 1930), American entrepreneur, author, publisher and motivational speaker
 Linda Villarosa (born 1959), American author and journalist
 Shari Villarosa (born 1951), American diplomat

Other 
 Villa R (Paul Klee), painting by Paul Klee, it is thought to be named "Villa Rosa"